Elections to Leeds City Council were held on 6 May 1976, with one third of the council up for election. In the interim between the seats first election in 1973, in addition to Labour's 1974 Burley gain, there had been a further three by-elections - and consequent successful defences of - Beeston & Holbeck and Burmantofts & Richmond Hill (Labour) and Headingley (Conservative).

The Conservatives managed to largely repeat their previous year's results, gaining a total of seven and winning control of the council. They gained three from Labour, in the wards of Morley South and Wortley, as well as winning back the aforementioned seat in Burley. The remaining four gains were from the Liberals in Horsforth, both of the Pudsey seats and Otley.

Election result

|- style="background-color:#F9F9F9"
! style="background-color: " |
| British National
| align="right" | 0
| align="right" | 0
| align="right" | 0
| align="right" | 0
| align="right" | 0.0
| align="right" | 0.2
| align="right" | 487
| align="right" | +0.2%
|-

This result has the following consequences for the total number of seats on the Council after the elections:

Ward results

|- style="background-color:#F9F9F9"
! style="background-color: " |
| British National
| J. Drury
| align="right" | 226
| align="right" | 3.0
| align="right" | +3.0
|-

|- style="background-color:#F9F9F9"
! style="background-color: " |
| British National
| Eddy Morrison
| align="right" | 211
| align="right" | 3.0
| align="right" | +3.0
|-

|- style="background-color:#F9F9F9"
! style="background-color: " |
| British National
| S. Brown
| align="right" | 50
| align="right" | 0.8
| align="right" | +0.8
|-

References

1976 English local elections
1976
1970s in Leeds
May 1976 events in the United Kingdom